The 1976–77 Liga Artzit season was the first in which Liga Artzit came into existence. the league had 12 clubs (expanded to 14 the next season as three clubs were relegated from the Liga Leumit and only one promoted).

Hapoel Hadera won the title and promotion to Liga Leumit. Only one club was promoted as Liga Leumit was being reduced in size from 16 to 14 clubs.

Beitar Netanya and Maccabi Hadera were both relegated to Liga Alef

Final table

References

1976-77 Hapoel Petah Tikva Museum 

Liga Artzit seasons
Israel
2